The Wisconsin Integrally Synchronized Computer (WISC) was an early digital computer designed and built at the University of Wisconsin–Madison. Operational in 1954, it was the first digital computer in the state.

Pioneering computer designer Gene Amdahl drafted the WISC's design as his PhD thesis. The computer was built over the period 1951-1954. It had 1,024 50-bit words (equivalent to about 6 KB) of drum memory, with an operation time of 1/15 second and throughput of 60 operations per second, which was achieved by an early form of instruction pipeline. It was capable of both fixed and floating point operation.

Part of it is at the Computer History Museum.

References

External links
Oral history interview with Gene M. Amdahl. Charles Babbage Institute, University of Minnesota, Minneapolis. Amdahl starts by describing his early life and education, recalling his experiences teaching in the Advanced Specialized Training Program during and after World War II. Amdahl discusses his graduate work at the University of Wisconsin and his direction of the design and construction of the Wisconsin Integrally Synchronized Computer. Describes his role in the design of several computers for IBM including the STRETCH, IBM 701, 701A, and IBM 704. He discusses his work with Nathaniel Rochester and IBM's management of the design process for computers. He also mentions his work with Ramo-Wooldridge, Aeronutronic, and Computer Sciences Corporation.
 Contains Gene Amdahl's PhD thesis and WISC User's Manual

Photos:

Early computers
One-of-a-kind computers